Ludmila Kuchar Foxlee was a social worker at the Ellis Island immigration station. Employed by the YWCA after World War I, Foxlee spent time in Czechoslovakia to assist in rebuilding efforts before working at Ellis Island from 1920 to 1937. She became one of most well-known immigrant aid workers and her meticulous notes are currently stored at the Ellis Island archives (National Park Service).

Early life 
Foxlee was born in Bohemia in 1885. She emigrated to this country in 1892 with her parents and siblings. For many years, Mrs. Foxlee toured the United States and Canada as a singer and actress with the Annie Russel Theatrical Company. 

During one of these tours, her husband, John, joined the company as a set designer and subsequently they were married. During some of Thomas Edison's early experiments with the phonograph, she acted as his singing recording star.

Social work 
After World War I, she traveled to Czechoslovakia to aid the YWCA in setting up camps and schools for orphaned girls. Tomas Masaryk, president of Czechoslovakian Republic presented her with the Order of the White Lion for her tremendous interest and work on behalf of his people. 

Foxlee helped thousands of detained immigrants at Ellis Island (1920-1937). She served as a translator, as she was fluent in several languages in addition to her native Czech. Foxlee was interested in the folk dress and music of newcomers. She also assisted in the immigrants' cultural assimilation to U.S. society, at times giving women a "makeover" with Americanized clothing.

Mrs. Foxlee carried on her interest in the Czechoslovakian people by writing a syndicated family life column for many years in their language for two Chicago based Czechoslovakian newspapers.

Family 
Her sister was married to the sculptor Joseph (Joza) Krupka (1880-1917) in 1906. When her sister's husband died in 1917 she made a decision to give her sister's two children a chance to grow up removed from the city congestion and  Mrs. Foxlee and her husband purchased a farm in Montvale NJ and to set up an antiques business.

On her death her YMCA and Ellis Island papers where given to the National Park Service.

She is buried in the Upper Saddle River Reformed Church Cemetery.

Footnotes 

American social workers
American community activists
American social reformers
1885 births
1971 deaths
Austro-Hungarian emigrants to the United States